The AACTA Award for Best Direction is an award presented by the Australian Academy of Cinema and Television Arts (AACTA), a non-profit organisation whose aim is to "identify, award, promote and celebrate Australia's greatest achievements in film and television." The award is presented at the annual AACTA Awards, which hand out accolades for achievements in feature film, television, documentaries and short films.

From 1969 to 2010, the category was presented by the Australian Film Institute (AFI), the Academy's parent organisation, at the annual Australian Film Institute Awards (known as the AFI Awards). When the AFI launched the Academy in 2011, it changed the annual ceremony to the AACTA Awards, with the current award being a continuum of the AFI Award for Best Direction.

Bruce Beresford, Rolf de Heer, Ray Lawrence, Baz Luhrmann, George Miller, Fred Schepisi, Peter Weir and Jennifer Kent have received the award the most times with two each. Paul Cox has been nominated seven times, more than any other director with one win.

Winners and nominees
In the following table, the years listed correspond to the year of film release; the ceremonies are usually held the same year. The director in bold and in dark blue background have received a special award; those in bold and in yellow background have won a regular competitive award. Those that are neither highlighted nor in bold are the nominees. Within each year, the table lists the winning director first and then the other nominees.

Notes

A: From 1958-2010, the awards were held during the year of the films release. However, the 1974-75 awards were held in 1975 for films released in 1974 and 1975, and the first AACTA Awards were held in 2012 for films released in 2011.
B: The Turning Ensemble consists of the seventeen people who directed their individual segments in the film. They are: Jonathan auf der Heide, Tony Ayres, Simon Stone, Jub Clerc, Robert Connolly, Shaun Gladwell, Rhys Graham, Justin Kurzel, Yaron Lifschitz, Anthony Lucas, Claire McCarthy, Ian Meadows, Ashlee Page, Stephen Page, Warwick Thornton, Marieka Walsh, Mia Wasikowska and David Wenham.

References

External links
 Official website of the Australian Academy of Cinema and Television Arts

Direction
Awards for best director
Awards established in 1971